The Argyllshire Gathering is an annual Highland games held in August in Oban, Scotland.

Solo piping events
The solo piping events at the Argyllshire Gathering are some of the most prestigious in the solo calendar.

Winning the Gold Medal for pibroch at either the Argyllshire Gathering or Northern Meeting qualifies the winner to play in the Senior Pibroch competition, and an invitation to play at the Glenfiddich Championships.

Entry to the Former Winners March, Strathspey & Reel is restricted to past winners of the A-Grade March, Strathspey & Reel event.

Winners

Eight players in history have won both Gold Medals in the same year, these players are denoted with an asterisk (*).

 2022
Jamie Forrester, - Phantom Piper of the Corrieyairick,
Connor Sinclair
Angus MacColl,  - Unjust Incarceration

References

Highland games in Scotland
Scottish awards
Scotland-related lists
Awards established in 1873
Oban
Lists of award winners